The Fredericton shooting was a mass shooting that occurred in Fredericton, New Brunswick, Canada, on the morning of 10 August 2018, in which four people, including two police officers, were killed. The shooter, Matthew Raymond, was found not criminally responsible in 2020.

Shooting 
On 10 August 2018, around 7:00 a.m. ADT, multiple witnesses reported dozens of shots being fired on Brookside Drive between Main Street and Ring Road in a residential neighbourhood on the north side of the city of Fredericton. The area was locked down by Fredericton Police, who told residents to stay in their homes. At 8:17, police said they were investigating a shooting with multiple fatalities, and asked people to avoid the area. The two deceased officers were reportedly the first responding officers to the scene, and the two civilian victims were already on the ground when officers responded.

Around 9:00, an apartment building located at 237 Brookside Drive was evacuated. A resident of the building told reporters that he awoke to gunshots around 8:30, looked out his window and saw three bodies. Officers stated around 9:30, they entered an apartment and arrested the suspect.

Around 11:00, local police said that there was no further threat to the public and the lockdown was lifted. Police said that the area would be contained for the "foreseeable future" due to the ongoing investigation.

Victims 
At 10:28 ADT, Fredericton Police said two of the four dead were police officers. Dr. Everett Chalmers Regional Hospital reported it was treating multiple victims. On 11 August, the hospital clarified that it had received only the four fatalities and the injured shooter.

The dead officers were 45-year-old Lawrence Robert Costello and 43-year-old Sara Burns. Police have identified two dead civilians as musician Donnie Robichaud and his girlfriend, Bobbie-Lee Wright. The ex-wife of victim Donnie Robichaud told the media that she swore at Prime Minister Justin Trudeau during his condolence call with her.

Suspect 
Police said they shot and arrested the suspect, a 48-year-old Matthew Vincent Raymond, who sustained serious injuries. Multiple media sources have reported that he was interested in first-person shooter video games and was known for being "ignorant" and "Islamophobic." Others, notably the office manager for the apartment complex, described him as "polite" and "pleasant." The suspect was charged with four counts of first degree murder. His trial began September 15, 2020. He was later found not criminally responsible.

Investigation 
The West District detachment of the Royal Canadian Mounted Police Major Crimes Division (RCMP) and Fredericton Police conducted an investigation into the shooting. Reporters at the scene were asked to provide any pertinent information to investigators. In the immediate aftermath, police were quoted as saying they were "at the early stages of a very significant event," and a spokesperson for Minister of Public Safety and Emergency Preparedness Ralph Goodale stated that, as it was a "developing situation," it would be "premature to determine whether there are any national security implications."

Fredericton Police also asked that any civilian witnesses make available whatever documentation they may have had of the incident in order to aid in the investigation.

The gunman is said to have fired onto people from an elevated position using a long gun.

A publication ban on the details of the shooting was lifted on August 17.

Reactions 
Canadian Prime Minister Justin Trudeau and Minister of Public Safety and Emergency Preparedness Ralph Goodale tweeted messages of support. New Brunswick Premier Brian Gallant and Fredericton Mayor Mike O'Brien shared their condolences for the victims and their families.

Police forces from across Canada also sent messages of solidarity and support on social media. Some residents of the area likened the incident to the 2014 Moncton shooting, and one said, "Immediately, I thought of Justin Bourque. Obviously, we have no way of knowing at this time what the situation is, but there seems to be the same level of worry and fear."

Tributes 
A memorial vigil was held on 10 August, at St. John the Evangelist Anglican Church, and a makeshift memorial for the victims was created outside the Fredericton Police Station. Fundraisers for the victims, were established through GoFundMe although initially neither the officers families nor the Fredericton Police had sanctioned any fundraisers on the website.

A local boy recorded a cover of Leonard Cohen's Hallelujah with some of the lyrics changed to focus on the two deceased officers. The initial video was viewed by over 400,000 times by 13 August, and he was invited to perform it live at one of the vigils for the victims.

On 18 August, the two officers were given a regimental funeral. It was attended by hundreds of police officers from around the country, as well as friends and families of the victims.

See also 
 Danforth shooting
David Wynn
Moncton shooting

References 

2018 in New Brunswick
2018 mass shootings in Canada
2018 murders in Canada
August 2018 crimes in North America
August 2018 events in Canada
Canadian police officers killed in the line of duty
Fredericton
Mass murder in Canada
Mass murder in 2018
Murder in New Brunswick